Coleophora gaviaepennella is a moth of the family Coleophoridae. It is found from the southern part of the Western Palaearctic realm to Mongolia.

Adults are on wing in August.

The larvae feed on Atriplex tatarica and Atriplex tornabenii. They feed on the generative organs of their host plant.

References

gaviaepennella
Moths described in 1952
Moths of Europe
Moths of Asia